Dolans is a music venue and pub in Limerick, Ireland. Situated on the city's Dock Road, it opened as a music venue in 1994.

The Irish Music Rights Organisation gave Dolans its "Live Music Venue of the Year" award in 2014 and 2015.

References

External links
Official website

Music in Limerick (city)
Music venues in the Republic of Ireland